Castle Bottom is a British national nature reserve located near Yateley in Hampshire. It is part of Castle Bottom to Yateley and Hawley Commons, which is a Site of Special Scientific Interest, and Thames Basin Heaths Special Protection Area for the conservation of wild birds

Geography

The nature reserve is situated south-west of Yateley and is on the north-west border of Blackbushe Airport. Each of the valley mires has an acidic stream running through them.

History

There is evidence that the area was used by humans as far back as 1800 to 550 BC, with discovery of some ancient burial mounds. There is evidence of banks being built in the Western Mire, but it is not possible to date exactly when they were built

The land was owned by the Bramshill estate until 1952, when it was sold. The land was last owned by a manufacturer of quarry equipment before the council purchased the site.

In the early 20th century two cottages were built on the north border of the reserve. Used until the 1960s, they are now ruins.

Fauna

The nature reserve has the following fauna:

Mammals

Exmoor pony
European water vole
European badger
Common noctule
Common pipistrelle

Birds

Invertebrates

Reptiles, amphibians and other vertebrates

Grass snake
Vipera berus
Viviparous lizard
Anguis fragilis
Common frog
Common toad
Brown trout

Fungi

Morchella elata
Typhula quisquiliaris
Inonotus radiatus
Schizophyllum commune
Tricholoma cingulatum
Panellus serotinus
Lactarius pubescens
Leccinum holopus
Tremella foliacea
Pisolithus arhizus

Flora

The nature reserve has the following flora:

Trees

Conifer
Scots pine
Silver Birch

Herbaceous plants

References

External links 
 Castle Bottom National Nature reserve

Nature reserves in Hampshire
National nature reserves in England